Streetheart is the self-titled and fifth studio album by Canadian rock band Streetheart, released in 1982. The album features some of the band's best known songs, including What Kind of Love is This, Snow White, and Look in Your Eyes. Streetheart would prove to be the band's most successful album; in 2009 Streetheart would be certified Double Platinum in Canada (in excess of 200,000 copies sold).

Track listing

All songs are written by Kenny Shields, Ken Sinnaeve, Daryl Gutheil, and Jeff Neill

 "Without Your Love" – 5:03
 "Mad as Hell" – 3:40
 "Miss Plaza Suite – 5:39
 "Wired" – 3:13
 "What Kind of Love is This" – 3:48
 "Snow White" – 3:55
 "Look in Your Eyes" – 4:49
 "Ain't in No Hurry" – 5:00
 "One More Time" – 4:33

Personnel

Streetheart

 Kenny Shields – lead vocals, percussion
 Daryl Gutheil – keyboards, backing vocals
 Jeff Neill – guitar, backing vocals
 Ken 'Spider' Sinnaeve – bass
 Herb Ego – drums

Production

 George Semkiw – producer, engineer
 Paul Bonish – assistant engineer
 Ralph Watts – engineer
 Terry DiMonte and Tom Powell – art direction
 Deborah Samuel – band photography
 Russ Mitchell – lyrical arrangement

References

Streetheart (band) albums
1982 albums